Thake is a surname. Notable people with the surname include:

Al Thake (1849–1872), British baseball player 
Charles Thake (1927–2018), Maltese actor
Eric Thake (1904–1982), Australian artist
Shanta Thake (born 1979), American theatre director

See also
Thaker (surname)